Kubanochoerus is an extinct genus of large, long-legged suid artiodactyl mammal from the Miocene of Eurasia and Africa.

Taxonomy 

The genera Libycochoerus and Megalochoerus were once assigned to Kubanochoerus but are now considered distinct based on dental and minor cranial details.

The putative paraceratheriid genus Caucasotherium, described from the Caucasus on the basis of a bone fragment with four incisors, is actually a synonym of the Middle Miocene Kubanochoerus gigas.

Description 
 
The heads of these pigs were unmistakable, with small eyebrow horns, and a large horn emanating from the forehead of the males. It is speculated that the males used their forehead horns for jousting with each other.

References

Bibliography

External links 
 
 Kubanochoerus photo-reconstruction by paleoartist Roman Uchytel

Prehistoric Suidae
Miocene even-toed ungulates
Miocene mammals of Africa
Fossils of Kenya
Miocene mammals of Asia
Fossils of China
Miocene mammals of Europe
Fossils of Russia
Fossil taxa described in 1955
Prehistoric even-toed ungulate genera